Maja Apostoloska (born 7 December 1976) is a Macedonian poet, essayist and literary critic. She holds a B.A. in Comparative Literature from the "Blaže Koneski" Faculty of Philology in Skopje, where she is currently attending Macedonian language postgraduate studies. She is an editor of literary magazine "Kniževno žitie".

Books
 "Именувањето" (Naming; poetry). Skopje: Dom na kultura 'Kočo Racin', 2009. 43 p. 
 "Зад текстовите" (Behind the Texts; literary criticism, essays and studies). Skopje: Makedonska reč, 2007. 165 p. 
 "Прекин на комуникацијата" (Communication Breakdown; poetry). Skopje: Bata press, 2004. 48 p. 
 "Заиграј, веќе, мастилаво!" (Play at Last, Inky!; poetry). Skopje: Zumpres, 2000. 48 p.

Other literary works
Together with Jovica Tasevski-Eternijan, she has edited a selection of contemporary Macedonian poetry containing Biblical, religious and apocryphal elements, which was published as a thematic issue of the "Stremež" magazine (No. 11-12, 2000).

References
 Blesok: Maja Apostoloska
 www.culture.in.mk: New book by Maja Apostoloska
 www.culture.in.mk: Maja Apostoloska awarded with Beli Mugri

Macedonian poets
Macedonian women poets
1976 births
Apostoloska Maja
20th-century Macedonian poets
21st-century Macedonian poets